The South Tees Development Corporation (STDC) is the first Mayoral Development Corporation outside of Greater London established under the Cities and Local Government Devolution Act 2016. It was created to "promote the economic growth and commercial development of Tees Valley by converting assets in the South Tees area into opportunities for business investment and economic growth".

The jurisdiction comprises approximately 1,800 hectares of land to the south of the River Tees in the Borough of Redcar and Cleveland. The land includes former Teesside Steelworks and other industrial sites and is close to Teesport.

Board members
There are 16 members; the Tees Valley Mayor, Leader of Redcar and Cleveland Borough Council, and the Mayor of Middlesbrough have statutory posts on the board.

Executive Team
The executive team is:
David Allison, Chief Executive Officer
Julie Gilhespie, Chief Executive
John McNicholas, Engineering & Programme Director

Compulsory Purchase Order
The Corporation made a Compulsory Purchase Order for land at the former Redcar Steel Works in April 2019. The valuation of the site has been contested by the owners Sahaviriya Steel Industries and the process is expected to take 15 months.

See also
Teesside Development Corporation
Tees Valley Regeneration

References

External links
The South Tees Development Corporation (Establishment) Order 2017
South Tees Site Company Limited
Statistical Geography (ONS/GSS) E51000004
South Tees Development Corporation (MHCLG)
SSI Compulsory Purchase Order (Tees Valley Mayor)

Development Corporations of the United Kingdom
Government agencies established in 2017